The Mark Inside is a book by Amy Reading about a Texas rancher set in 1919.

References

2012 American novels
1919 in Texas
Fiction set in 1919
Novels set in the 1910s
Alfred A. Knopf books